Forty Mile Scrub is a national park in Queensland (Australia), 224 km drive southwest of Cairns.

Ancient volcanic streams, grass forests, springs, streams, and a preserved isolated pocket of semi-evergreen vines are just some of the contents of this beautiful national park.

Many species of animals have found refuge here, some permanently, and some come occasionally, like koalas. This is home to the largest cockroach in the world.

References

See also

 Protected areas of Queensland (Australia)
Fensham, R. J. “Floristics and Environmental Relations of Inland Dry Rainforest in North Queensland, Australia.” Journal of Biogeography, vol. 22, no. 6, Wiley, 1995, pp. 1047–63, https://doi.org/10.2307/2845834

National parks of Far North Queensland
Protected areas established in 1970
1970 establishments in Australia